The coat of arms of South Australia is the official symbol of the state of South Australia. It was granted by Queen Elizabeth II on 19 April 1984. They replaced a coat of arms granted to the State in 1936 by King Edward VIII.

The shield has the piping shrike within a golden disc (officially said to represent the rising sun) on a blue background. The piping shrike is the unofficial bird emblem of South Australia and also appears on the State Badge. The crest is the Sturt's desert pea, the floral emblem of South Australia, on top of a wreath of the State colours. The coat of arms has no supporters, but a 1984 proposal showed koala and wombat supporters. The compartment, or base, is a grassland with symbols of agriculture and industry, and a motto with the name "South Australia".

Historical arms

See also
 Flag of South Australia
 Government of South Australia
 Australian heraldry

External links
The State Coat of Arms of South Australia
Download the State Coat of Arms of South Australia

Emblems of South Australia
South Australia
South Australia
South Australia
South Australia
South Australia
South Australia